The John Cole Farm (also known as Intervale Farm) is an historic colonial farm on Reservoir Road in the far northeast of Cumberland, Rhode Island.  The main farmhouse, a -story Cape style wood-frame structure, was built c. 1770 by John Cole not long after his acquisition of the property.  The property, including a half-dozen outbuildings, has had only minimal intrusion of modern 20th-century amenities, and is a well-kept example of vernacular rural architecture of the late 18th century.

The farm was listed on the National Register of Historic Places in 1977.

See also
National Register of Historic Places listings in Providence County, Rhode Island

References

Houses completed in 1770
Farms on the National Register of Historic Places in Rhode Island
Houses in Cumberland, Rhode Island
National Register of Historic Places in Providence County, Rhode Island
1770 establishments in Rhode Island